Joan Weldon (born Joan Louise Welton; August 5, 1930 – February 11, 2021) was an American actress and singer in film, television, and theatre.

Early years
Weldon was born in San Francisco, California, in 1930. Her grandmother, Olio Cornell, raised her there after she "was left motherless at five." Weldon's great-grandfather was an actor on stage and in vaudeville. She attended Galileo High School, and was inducted into their Hall of Merit in 2019.

Stage

Weldon began her career singing in the San Francisco Grand Opera Company chorus. She also sang with the Los Angeles Civic Light Opera. On Broadway, she appeared in Kean. She sang at the opening of the New York State Theater at Lincoln Center in 1964.

After working in film and television, she resumed her career as a singer in road company productions including The Music Man and Oklahoma! Weldon retired in 1980.

Radio
In 1953, Weldon appeared as the soprano soloist on a broadcast of The Standard Hour on NBC radio.

Film
Weldon's film debut came in the 1953 film The System. Although her background was singing in operas, The System and her next two films, So This Is Love and Rear Guard, all had her in non-singing roles.

She became a contract actress with Warner Bros. where she remained until her contract ended in 1954. Her most prominent film was the cult thriller Them!

Television
Weldon had a brief television career in the 1950s. Her first appearance in 1955 was in an episode of The Millionaire, starring Marvin Miller.  She made three appearances on Lux Video Theater in various roles. She also played Marian Keats in the title role of the Perry Mason episode, "The Case of the Angry Mourner" in 1957 (Season 1, episode 7). In 1958, she portrayed Grace Wheeler in an episode of Maverick titled "Plunder of Paradise" starring Jack Kelly, Leo Gordon and Ruta Lee. She appeared in the Have Gun-Will Travel episode “The Singer”. Her final television appearance was in 1958 on Shirley Temple Theater.

In 1955, Weldon was one of the regular singers on the syndicated program This Is Your Music.

Filmography 

The System (1953) as Felice Stuart
So This Is Love (1953) as Ruth Obre
The Stranger Wore a Gun (1953) as Shelby Conroy
The Command (1954) as Martha Cutting
The Boy from Oklahoma (1954) as Maybelle - Saloon Girl on Porch (uncredited)
Riding Shotgun (1954) as Orissa Flynn
Them! (1954) as Dr. Patricia Medford
Deep in My Heart (1954) as Performer in 'New Moon'
Lux Video Theatre (1954–1956, TV Series) as Anne / Patricia Dean
The Millionaire (1955, TV Series) as Star Conway
Gunsight Ridge (1957) as Molly Jones
Cheyenne (1957, TV Series) as Nellie Merritt
Perry Mason (1957, TV Series) as Marion Keats
Day of the Badman (1958) as Myra Owens
Have Gun - Will Travel (1958, TV Series) as Faye Hollister
Colt .45 (1958, TV Series) as Edith Murrow
Maverick (1958, TV Series) as Grace Wheeler
Shirley Temple's Storybook (1958, TV Series) as Amelia
Home Before Dark (1958) as Frances Barrett (final film role)

References

External links
 
 Joan Weldon at Yahoo Movies
 

1930 births
2021 deaths
20th-century American actresses
Actresses from California
Actresses from San Francisco
American film actresses
American musical theatre actresses
American radio actresses
American stage actresses
American television actresses
Warner Bros. contract players
21st-century American women